Taboada, is a municipality in the Spanish province of Lugo.

Located on the southwest of the Council of Lugo, right in the centre of Galicia, Taboada offers a natural entry to the Sacred Riverside (Ribeira Sacra).

With a population of over three thousand inhabitants, distributed in 27 parishes, Taboada occupies an area of 146 square Km, bordering with Antas de Ulla, Monterroso, Portomarín, Paradela, O Saviñao, Chantada (capital city of the county) and Rodeiro.

Municipalities in the Province of Lugo